is a station on the Tama Toshi Monorail Line in Hino, Tokyo, Japan.

Lines
Hodokubo Station is a station on the Tama Toshi Monorail Line and is located 11.3 kilometers from the terminus of the line at Kamikitadai Station.

Station layout
Hodokubo Station is a raised station with two tracks and two opposed side platforms, with the station building located underneath. It is a standardized station building for this monorail line.

Platforms

History
The station opened on 10 January 2000.

Station numbering was introduced in February 2018 with Hodokubo being assigned TT06.

Surrounding area
The station is above Tokyo Metropolitan Route 503 as it parallels the Keiō Dōbutsuen Line. The area is primarily residential.
Other points of interest include:
 Hino City Yumegaoka Elementary School
 Hino Takahatadai Post Office
 Hino City Furusato Museum

References

External links

 Tama Monorail Hodokubo Station 

Railway stations in Japan opened in 2000
Railway stations in Tokyo
Tama Toshi Monorail
Hino, Tokyo